Eltoprazine (developmental code name DU-28,853) is a serotonergic drug of the phenylpiperazine class which is described as a serenic or antiaggressive agent. It acts as an agonist of the serotonin 5-HT1A and 5-HT1B receptors and as an antagonist of the serotonin 5-HT2C receptor. The drug is closely related to fluprazine and batoprazine, which are similarly acting agents, and is also a known chemical precursor to S-15535 and lecozotan. Eltoprazine is or was under development for the treatment of aggression, attention deficit hyperactivity disorder (ADHD), cognition disorders, and drug-induced dyskinesia, but no recent development has been reported for these indications as of February 2022. It was also under development for the treatment of psychotic disorders, but development for this indication was discontinued. Eltoprazine was originated by Solvay and was developed by Elto Pharma, PsychoGenics, and Solvay.

References

External links
 
 Eltoprazine - AdisInsight

5-HT1A agonists
5-HT1B agonists
5-HT2C antagonists
Benzodioxins
 
Experimental drugs
Piperazines
Serotonin receptor agonists